Back Cove is a former hamlet on the Labrador coast. The nearest port of call was Dead Island, Labrador.

See also 
 List of ghost towns in Newfoundland and Labrador

Ghost towns in Newfoundland and Labrador